Supply-side economics is a macroeconomic theory that postulates economic growth can be most effectively fostered by lowering taxes, decreasing regulation, and allowing free trade. According to supply-side economics, consumers will benefit from greater supplies of goods and services at lower prices, and employment will increase. Supply-side fiscal policies are designed to increase aggregate supply, as opposed to aggregate demand, thereby expanding output and employment while lowering prices. Such policies are of several general varieties:
Investments in human capital, such as education, healthcare, and encouraging the transfer of technologies and business processes, to improve productivity (output per worker). Encouraging globalized free trade via containerization is a major recent example.
Tax reduction, to provide incentives to work, invest and take risks. Lowering income tax rates and eliminating or lowering tariffs are examples of such policies.
Investments in new capital equipment and research and development (R&D), to further improve productivity. Allowing businesses to depreciate capital equipment more rapidly (e.g., over one year as opposed to 10) gives them an immediate financial incentive to invest in such equipment.
Reduction in government regulations, to encourage business formation and expansion.

A basis of supply-side economics is the Laffer curve, a theoretical relationship between rates of taxation and government revenue.  The Laffer curve suggests that when the tax level is too high, lowering tax rates will boost government revenue through higher economic growth, though the level at which rates are deemed "too high" is disputed. A 2012 poll of leading economists found none agreed that reducing the US federal income tax rate would result in higher annual tax revenue within five years. Critics also argue that several large tax cuts in the United States over the last 40 years have not increased revenue.

The term "supply-side economics" was thought for some time to have been coined by the journalist Jude Wanniski in 1975; according to Robert D. Atkinson, the term "supply side" was first used in 1976 by Herbert Stein (a former economic adviser to President Richard Nixon) and only later that year was this term repeated by Jude Wanniski. The term alludes to ideas of the economists Robert Mundell and Arthur Laffer.

Historical origins 

Supply-side economics developed in response to the stagflation of the 1970s. It drew on a range of non-Keynesian economic thought, including the Chicago School and New Classical School. Bruce Bartlett, an advocate of supply-side economics, traced the school of thought's intellectual descent from the philosophers Ibn Khaldun and David Hume, satirist Jonathan Swift, political economist Adam Smith and United States Secretary of the Treasury Alexander Hamilton.

Bartlett stated in 2007 that

Current day advocates of supply-side economic policies claim that lower tax rates produce macroeconomic benefits and emphasize this benefit rather than their traditional ideological Classical liberals opposion to taxation  because they opposed government in general. Their traditional claim was that each man had a right to himself and his property and therefore taxation was immoral and of questionable legal grounding. On the other hand, supply-side economists argued that the alleged collective benefit (i.e. increased economic output and efficiency) provided the main impetus for tax cuts.

As in classical economics, supply-side economics proposed that production or supply is the key to economic prosperity and that consumption or demand is merely a secondary consequence. Early on, this idea had been summarized in Say's Law of economics, which states: "A product is no sooner created, than it, from that instant, affords a market for other products to the full extent of its own value."

Supply-side economics rose in popularity among Republican Party politicians from 1977 onwards. Prior to 1977, Republicans were more split on tax reduction, with some worrying that tax cuts would fuel inflation and exacerbate deficits.

In 1978, Jude Wanniski published The Way the World Works in which he laid out the central thesis of supply-side economics and detailed the failure of high tax rate progressive income tax systems and United States monetary policy under Richard Nixon and Jimmy Carter in the 1970s. Wanniski advocated lower tax rates and a return to some kind of gold standard, similar to the 1944–1971 Bretton Woods System that Nixon abandoned.

Definition and principles 
James D. Gwartney and Richard L. Stroup provide a definition of supply-side economics as the belief that adjustments in marginal tax rates have significant effects on the total supply. Gwartney and Stroup said "that the supply-side argument provided the foundation for the Reagan tax policy, which led to significant reductions in marginal tax rates in the United States during the 1980s".

Barry P. Bosworth has provided another definition by presenting the supply-side economics from two perspectives:

 "A broad interest in the determinants of aggregate supply – the volume and quality of the capital and labor inputs and the efficiency with which they are used"
 "A narrower focus on tax reductions as a means of increasing the supply of savings, investment, and labor."

Supply-side vs. previous approaches to economic policy 
Supply-side economics has originated as an alternative to Keynesian economics, which focused macroeconomic policy on management of final demand. Demand-side economics relies on a fixed-price view of the economy, where the demand plays a key role in defining the future supply growth, which also allows for incentive implications of investment.

The Keynesian policy approaches focus on demand management as a major instrument to affect aggregate production and GNP, while Monetarism focuses on management of monetary aggregates and credit. Unlike supply-side economics, demand-side economics is based on the assumption that increases in GNP result from increased spending.

Traditional policy approaches were challenged by the theory of supply-side economics in the Reagan Administration of the 1980s. It claims that fiscal policy may lead to changes in supply as well as in demand. So, when marginal tax rates are high, consumers pursue additional leisure and current consumption instead of pursuing current income and extra income in the future. Therefore, there is a decline in work effort and investment, which in turn causes a decrease of production and GNP, regardless of the total demand levels.

On these assumptions, supply side economists formulate the idea that a cut in marginal tax rates has a positive effect on economic growth.

Role of the marginal tax rates 
The main focus of supply-side economics is promotion of economic growth. In this regard, some studies have suggested to consider two relative prices.

The first one influences decisions of individuals on the distribution of their income between consumption and savings. The cost of individual’s decision to assign a unit of income to either consumption or savings is a future value of the unit, which has been given up by choosing either to consume or to save. The unit of income value is defined by the marginal tax rates. Therefore, higher tax rates would decrease the cost of consumption, which would cause a fall in investment and savings. At the same time, lower tax rates would cause the investment and savings levels to rise, while the consumption levels would fall.

The second price influences decisions of individuals on the distribution of their time between work and leisure. The cost of individual’s decision to allocate a unit of time either to work or leisure stands for current income, which was given up by choosing either work or leisure. The cost also includes the future income, which was given up for leisure instead of enhancing the professional skills. The value of lost income is defined by the tax rate assigned to the additional income. Therefore, the increase in marginal tax rates leads to a decrease in the price of leisure. However, if the marginal tax rate decline, the cost of leisure increases.

Both the amount of retained and taxed income is determined by the marginal tax rate. That is why, from a supply-side economist's standpoint, marginal tax rates play a significant role in determining the development of the economy. Due to crucial role in determining how much time workers will spend on work and leisure or how much income will be spent on consumption and for savings, supply-side economists insist on decreasing tax rates as they believe it could improve the growth rates of the economy.

Laffer curve 
Laffer curve illustrates a mathematical relationship between tax revenues and tax rates, which was popularized by economist Arthur B. Laffer in 1974. Supply-side economics highly depends on the implications, which follow from the relationship presented by the curve. It shows that higher tax rates can sometimes decrease the tax base, which will lead to the decrease in tax revenues even if the tax rates are high. Due to the effect exerted by taxes on the taxed income, the adjustment of tax rates may not lead to proportional changes in tax revenues. That is why, some supply-side economists insist that the decreasing of too high tax rates can result in the increase of the tax revenues.

The Laffer curve embodies a postulate of supply-side economics: that tax rates and tax revenues are distinct, with government tax revenues the same at a 100% tax rate as they are at a 0% tax rate and maximum revenue somewhere in between these two values. Supply-siders argued that in a high tax rate environment lowering tax rates would result in either increased revenues or smaller revenue losses than one would expect relying on only static estimates of the previous tax base.

This led supply-siders to advocate large reductions in marginal income and capital gains tax rates to encourage greater investment, which would produce more supply. Jude Wanniski and many others advocate a zero capital gains rate. The increased aggregate supply should result in increased aggregate demand, hence the term "supply-side economics".

History

Reaganomics 
In the United States, commentators frequently equate supply-side economics with Reaganomics. The administration of Republican president Ronald Reagan promoted its fiscal policies as being based on supply-side economics. Reagan made supply-side economics a household phrase and promised an across-the-board reduction in income tax rates and an even larger reduction in capital gains tax rates. During Reagan's 1980 presidential campaign, the key economic concern was double digit inflation, which Reagan described as "[t]oo many dollars chasing too few goods", but rather than the usual dose of tight money, recession and layoffs, with their consequent loss of production and wealth, he promised a gradual and painless way to fight inflation by "producing our way out of it".

Switching from earlier monetary policy, Federal Reserve chair Paul Volcker implemented tighter monetary policies including lower money supply growth to break the inflationary psychology and squeeze inflationary expectations out of the economic system. Therefore, supply-side supporters argue that Reaganomics was only partially based on supply-side economics.

Congress under Reagan passed a plan that would slash taxes by $749 billion over five years. Critics claim that the tax cuts increased budget deficits while Reagan supporters credit them with helping the 1980s economic expansion and argued that the budget deficit would have decreased if not for massive increases in military spending. As a result, Jason Hymowitz cited Reagan—along with Jack Kemp—as a great advocate for supply-side economics in politics and repeatedly praised his leadership.

Critics of Reaganomics claim it failed to produce much of the exaggerated gains some supply-siders had promised. Paul Krugman later summarized the situation: "When Ronald Reagan was elected, the supply-siders got a chance to try out their ideas. Unfortunately, they failed." Although he credited supply-side economics for being more successful than monetarism which he claimed "left the economy in ruins", he stated that supply-side economics produced results which fell "so far short of what it promised", describing the supply-side theory as "free lunches".

Clinton years 

Clinton signed the Omnibus Budget Reconciliation Act of 1993 into law, which raised income taxes rates on incomes above $115,000, created additional higher tax brackets for corporate income over $335,000, removed the cap on Medicare taxes, raised fuel taxes and increased the portion of Social Security income subject to tax, among other tax increases. Frankel and Orszag described the “progressive fiscal conservatism" of the 1993 package: "Such progressive fiscal conservatism combines modest attempts at redistribution (the progressive component) and budget discipline (the fiscal conservative component). Thus the 1993 package included significant spending reductions and tax increases. But it concentrated the tax increases on upper-income taxpayers, while substantially expanding the Earned Income Tax Credit, Head Start, and other government programs aimed at lower earners." The tax increases led to greater revenue (relative to a baseline without a tax increase).

The bill was strongly opposed by Republicans, vigorously attacked by John Kasich and Minority Whip Newt Gingrich as destined to cause job losses and lower revenue.

Economist Paul Krugman wrote in 2017 that Clinton's tax increases on the rich provided counter-example to the supply-side tax cut doctrine: "Bill Clinton provided a clear test, by raising taxes on the rich. Republicans predicted disaster, but instead the economy boomed, creating more jobs than under Reagan."

Supply-side economist Alan Reynolds argued that the Clinton era represented a continuation of a low tax policy (from the 1980s):

Kansas experiment

In May 2012, Sam Brownback, Governor of the state of Kansas, signed into law the "Kansas Senate Bill Substitute HB 2117", which cut the number of individual income tax brackets from three to two, and cut the top income tax rates from 6.45% and 6.25% to 4.9% and the bottom rate from 3.5% to 3%. It also eliminated the 7% tax on "pass-through" income, income that businesses — such as sole proprietorships, partnerships, limited liability companies, and subchapter S corporations — pass on to their owners instead of paying corporate income tax on, for the owners of almost 200,000 businesses The law cut taxes by 231 million in its first year, and cuts were projected to increase to 934 million annually after six years.

The cuts were based on model legislation published by the conservative American Legislative Exchange Council (ALEC), and were supported by The Wall Street Journal, supply-side economist Arthur Laffer, economics commentator Stephen Moore and anti-tax leader Grover Norquist. The tax cuts have been called the "Kansas experiment", and was described by the Brookings Institution as "one of the cleanest experiments for how tax cuts effect economic growth in the U.S."

Brownback compared his tax cut policies with those of Ronald Reagan, but also described them as "a real live experiment ... We'll see how it works.", Brownback forecast his cuts would create an additional 23,000 jobs in Kansas by 2020, and was intended to generate rapid economic growth, which he said would be "like a shot of adrenaline into the heart of the Kansas economy." On the other hand, the Kansas Legislature's research staff warned of the possibility of a deficit of nearly 2.5 billion by July 2018.

By 2017, state revenues had fallen by hundreds of millions of dollars 
causing spending on roads, bridges, and education to be slashed, but instead of boosting economic growth, growth in Kansas remained consistently below average. A working paper by two economists at Oklahoma State University (Dan Rickman and Hongbo Wang) using historical data from several other states with economies structured similarly to Kansas found that the Kansas economy grew about 7.8% less and employment about 2.6% less than it would have had Brownback not cut taxes.
In 2017, the Republican Legislature of Kansas voted to roll back the cuts, and after Brownback vetoed the repeal, overrode his veto.

According to Max Ehrenfreund, economists generally agree that an explanation for the reduction instead of increase in economic growth from the tax cuts is that "any" benefits from tax cuts come over the long, not short run, but what does come in the short run is a major decline in demand for goods and services. In the Kansas economy cuts in state government expenditures cut incomes of state government "employees, suppliers and contractors" who spent much or most of their incomes locally. In addition, concern over the state's large budget deficits "might have deterred businesses from making major new investments".

One problem Kansas encountered is that while studies have shown that tax cuts increase economic growth, the increased revenue from that growth at the new lower tax rates are only enough to make up for 10-30% of the tax cuts, meaning that to avoid deficits, spending cuts must also be made.

Trump years 

Supply-side advocates Laffer and economics commentators Stephen Moore and Larry Kudlow played prominent roles in formulating Trump’s economic policies by advising him on his tax cut, as well as encouraging him to lower trade barriers. Laffer and Moore wrote a 2018 book about the policy, Trumponomics, with a foreword by Kudlow. Economist Gregory Mankiw reviewed the book in Foreign Affairs, and characterized the statements around Trump's policies as "snake-oil economics". He criticized the authors for un-apologetically parroting the president's claimed annual growth rates spawned by his tax cut to be 1-4%, when the highest reasonable estimates were around 0.5%, but also credits them for continuing to support the consensus view that free trade is good for all, against the president's mercantilist views. He also criticized them for following a simplistic "economic growth will solve all problems" approach, when previous presidential economic advisors had been more nuanced, recognizing the unavoidable tradeoff between equity and efficiency in their approaches to managing the economy.

Trump implemented individual and corporate income tax cuts which took effect in 2018. Rutgers economics professor Farrokh Langdana claimed that the Trump tax cuts were an example of supply-side tax policy, citing a letter from economists long-associated with the supply-side theory describing them as such.

Fiscal policy theory 
One benefit of a supply-side policy is that shifting the aggregate supply curve outward means prices can be lowered along with expanding output and employment. This is in contrast to demand-side policies (e.g., higher government spending), which even if successful tend to create inflationary pressures (i.e., raise the aggregate price level) as the aggregate demand curve shifts outward. Infrastructure investment is an example of a policy that has both demand-side and supply-side elements.

Supply-side economics holds that increased taxation steadily reduces economic activity within a nation and discourages investment. Taxes act as a type of trade barrier or tariff that causes economic participants to revert to less efficient means of satisfying their needs. As such, higher taxation leads to lower levels of specialization and lower economic efficiency. The idea is said to be illustrated by the Laffer curve.

Supply-side economists have less to say on the effects of deficits and sometimes cite Robert Barro’s work that states that rational economic actors will buy bonds in sufficient quantities to reduce long-term interest rates.

Effect on economic growth and tax revenues 
Bruce Bartlett stated in 2007 that "The original supply-siders suggested that some tax cuts, under very special circumstances, might actually raise federal revenues. ... But today it is common to hear tax cutters claim, implausibly, that all tax cuts raise revenue."

Some contemporary economists do not consider supply-side economics a tenable economic theory, with Alan Blinder calling it an "ill-fated" and perhaps "silly" school on the pages of a 2006 textbook. Greg Mankiw, former chairman of President President George W. Bush's Council of Economic Advisers, offered similarly sharp criticism of the school in the early editions of his introductory economics textbook. "Tax cuts rarely pay for themselves. My reading of the academic literature leads me to believe that about one-third of the cost of a typical tax cut is recouped with faster economic growth."

In a 1992 article for the Harvard International Review, James Tobin wrote: "The 'Laffer curve' idea that tax cuts would actually increase revenues turned out to deserve the ridicule."

Karl Case and Ray Fair wrote in Principles of Economics, "The extreme promises of supply-side economics did not materialize. President Reagan argued that because of the effect depicted in the Laffer curve, the government could maintain expenditures, cut tax rates, and balance the budget. This was not the case. Government revenues fell sharply from levels that would have been realized without the tax cuts."

Supply side proponents Trabandt and Uhlig argue that "static scoring overestimates the revenue loss for labor and capital tax cuts" and that "dynamic scoring" is a better predictor for the effects of tax cuts.

A 1999 study by University of Chicago economist Austan Goolsbee examined major changes in high-income tax rates in the United States from the 1920s onwards. It concluded that there were only modest changes in the reported income of high-income individuals, indicating that the tax changes had little effect on how much people work. He concluded that the notion that governments could raise more money by cutting rates "is unlikely to be true at anything like today's marginal tax rates." In 2015, one study found that in the past several decades, tax cuts in the U.S. seldom recouped revenue losses and had minimal impact on GDP growth.

A 2008 working paper found that in the case of Russia, "tax rate cuts can increase revenues by improving tax compliance."

The New Palgrave Dictionary of Economics reports that estimates of revenue-maximizing tax rates have varied widely, with a mid-range of around 70%.  According to a 2012 study, "the U.S. marginal top [tax] rate is far from the top of the Laffer curve." A 2012 survey found a consensus among leading economists that reducing the US federal income tax rate would raise GDP but would not increase tax revenue.

John Quiggin distinguishes between the Laffer curve and Laffer's analysis of tax rates. The Laffer curve was "correct but unoriginal", but Laffer's analysis that the United States was on the wrong side of the Laffer curve "was original but incorrect."

1920s tax cuts 

Proponents of supply-side economics have sometimes cited tax cuts enacted in the 1920s as evidence that tax cuts can increase tax revenue. After World War I, the highest tax bracket, which was for those earning over $100,000 a year (worth at least $1 million a year now), was over 70 percent. According to The Heritage Foundation, revenue acts of 1921, 1924 and 1926 reduced this tax rate to less than 25 percent, yet tax revenues actually went up significantly. Tax historian Joseph Thorndike argues that the tax cuts helped "bolster" growth but did not "cover the full cost of those tax cuts".

Revenue Act of 1964 

Proponents of supply-side economics sometimes cite tax cuts enacted by President Lyndon B. Johnson with the Revenue Act of 1964. John F. Kennedy had the year prior advocated a drastic tax-rate cut in 1963 when the top income tax rate was 91%, arguing that "[t]ax rates are too high today and tax revenues too low, and the soundest way to raise revenues in the long run is to cut rates now". The CBO concluded in 1978 that the tax cuts reduced tax revenue by $12 billion and that only between $3 billion to $9 million were recaptured due to bolstered economic growth. According to the CBO, "most of this rise [in revenues] was due to economic growth that would have taken place even without the tax cut."

At the same time, some studies have found a relatively robust response to tax cuts from the top 5% of tax returns. There has been identified an increase of 7.7% in revenues from the top 5%, from $17.17 billion US in 1963 to $18.49 billion in 1965. Hereby, the data have provided evidence that the group has been in the prohibitive part of the Laffer curve, because its input to total tax revenues have increased despite the tax rates decreasing significantly.

Reaganomics 

Supply-siders justified Reagan's tax cuts during the 1980s by claiming they would result in net increases in tax revenue, yet tax revenues declined (relative to a baseline without the cuts) due to Reagan's tax cuts, and the deficit ballooned during Reagan's term in office. The Treasury Department studied the Reagan tax cuts and concluded they significantly reduced tax revenues relative to a baseline without them. The 1990 budget by the Reagan administration concluded that the 1981 tax cuts had caused a reduction in tax revenue.

Both CBO and the Reagan Administration forecast that individual and business income tax revenues would be lower if the Reagan tax cut proposals were implemented, relative to a policy baseline without those cuts, by about $50 billion in 1982 and $210 billion by 1986. FICA tax revenue increased because in 1983 FICA tax rates were increased from 6.7% to 7% and the ceiling was raised by $2,100. For the self-employed, the FICA tax rate went from 9.35% to 14%. The FICA tax rate increased throughout Reagan's term and rose to 7.51% in 1988 and the ceiling was raised by 61% through Reagan's two terms. Those tax hikes on wage earners, along with inflation, were the source of revenue gains in the early 1980s.

It has been contended by some supply-side critics that the argument to lower taxes to increase revenues was a smokescreen for "starving" the government of revenues in the hope that the tax cuts would lead to a corresponding drop in government spending, but this did not turn out to be the case. Paul Samuelson called this notion "the tape worm theory—the idea that the way to get rid of a tape worm is [to] stab your patient in the stomach".

There is frequent confusion on the meaning of the term "supply-side economics" between the related ideas of the existence of the Laffer Curve and the belief that decreasing tax rates can increase tax revenues. Many supply-side economists doubt the latter claim while still supporting the general policy of tax cuts. Economist Gregory Mankiw used the term "fad economics" to describe the notion of tax rate cuts increasing revenue in the third edition of his 2007 Principles of Macroeconomics textbook in a section entitled "Charlatans and Cranks": 

In 1986, Martin Feldstein — a self-described "traditional supply sider" who served as Reagan's chairman of the Council of Economic Advisors from 1982 to 1984 — characterized the "new supply siders" who emerged circa 1980:

What distinguished the new supply siders from the traditional supply siders as the 1980s began was not the policies they advocated but the claims that they made for those policies ... The "new" supply siders were much more extravagant in their claims. They projected rapid growth, dramatic increases in tax revenue, a sharp rise in saving, and a relatively painless reduction in inflation. The height of supply side hyperbole was the "Laffer curve" proposition that the tax cut would actually increase tax revenue because it would unleash an enormously depressed supply of effort. Another remarkable proposition was the claim that even if the tax cuts did lead to an increased budget deficit, that would not reduce the funds available for investment in plant and equipment because tax changes would raise the saving rate by enough to finance the increased deficit ... Nevertheless, I have no doubt that the loose talk of the supply side extremists gave fundamentally good policies a bad name and led to quantitative mistakes that not only contributed to subsequent budget deficits but that also made it more difficult to modify policy when those deficits became apparent.

Bush tax cuts 

During his presidency, President Bush signed the Economic Growth and Tax Relief Reconciliation Act of 2001 and Jobs and Growth Tax Relief Reconciliation Act of 2003, which entailed significant tax cuts. In 2003, the Congressional Budget Office conducted a dynamic scoring analysis of tax cuts advocated by supply advocates, and found that the Bush tax cuts would not pay for themselves. Two of the nine models used in the study predicted a large improvement in the deficit over the next ten years resulting from tax cuts, but only by making the assumption that people would work harder from 2004 to 2014 because they believed that tax rates would increase again in 2014, and they wanted to make more money before the tax cuts expired.

In 2006, the CBO released a study titled "A Dynamic Analysis of Permanent Extension of the President's Tax Relief". This study found that under the best possible scenario making tax cuts permanent would increase the economy "over the long run" by 0.7%. This study was criticized by many economists, including Harvard Economics Professor Greg Mankiw, who pointed out that the CBO used a very low value for the earnings-weighted compensated labor supply elasticity of 0.14. In a paper published in the Journal of Public Economics, Mankiw and Matthew Weinzierl noted that the current economics research would place an appropriate value for labor supply elasticity at around 0.5.

The Congressional Budget Office (CBO) estimated that extending the Bush tax cuts beyond their 2010 expiration would increase the deficit by $1.8 trillion over 10 years. The CBO also completed a study in 2005 analyzing a hypothetical 10% income tax cut and concluded that under various scenarios there would be minimal offsets to the loss of revenue. In other words, deficits would increase by nearly the same amount as the tax cut in the first five years with limited feedback revenue thereafter.

Nobel laureate economist Milton Friedman agreed the tax cuts would reduce tax revenues and result in intolerable deficits, though he supported them as a means to restrain federal spending. Friedman characterized the reduced government tax revenue as "cutting their allowance".

Douglas Holtz-Eakin was a Bush administration economist who was appointed director of the Congressional Budget Office in 2003. Under his leadership, the CBO undertook a study of income tax rates which found that any new revenue from tax cuts paled in comparison to their cost.

Dartmouth economics professor Andrew Samwick was the chief staff economist for the Bush Council of Economic Advisers from July 2003 to July 2004. Writing on his blog in 2007, Samwick urged his former colleagues in the Bush administration to avoid asserting that the Bush tax cuts paid for themselves, because "No thoughtful person believes it...Not a single one."

Trump tax cuts 
The New York Times reported in November 2018 that the Trump tax overhaul "has fattened the paychecks of most American workers, padded the profits of large corporations and sped economic growth." Cautioning that "its still early but ten months after the law took effect, the promised 'supply side' bump is harder to find than the sugar-high stimulus." The writers explained that "It's highly unusual for deficits...to grow this much during periods of prosperity" and that "the fiscal health of the U.S. is deteriorating fast, as revenues have declined sharply" (nearly $200 billion or about 6%) relative to the CBO forecast prior to the tax cuts. Results for 2018 included:
Contrary to claims the tax cuts would pay for themselves, the budget deficit rose to $779 billion in fiscal year 2018, up 17% versus the prior year.
Corporate tax revenues were down by one-third in fiscal year 2018.
Stock buyback activity increased significantly.
GDP growth, business investment and corporate profits increased.
A typical worker in a large company got a $225 raise or one-time bonus, due to the law.
Real wage growth (adjusted for inflation) was slightly slower in 2018 than 2017.

Analysis conducted by the Congressional Research Service on the first-year effect of the tax cut found that little if any economic growth in 2018 could be attributed to it. Growth in GDP, employment, worker compensation and business investment slowed during the second year following enactment of the tax cut, prior to the emergence of the COVID-19 pandemic.

Following the Trump tax cut, top White House economic advisor Larry Kudlow falsely asserted that federal revenues had increased about 10% since the tax cut, though they had actually declined. He also falsely asserted that the CBO had found the "entire $1.5 trillion tax cut is virtually paid for by higher revenues and better nominal GDP."

Effect on income inequality 

Income inequality can be measured both pre- and after-tax. There is no consensus on the effects of income tax cuts on pre-tax income inequality, although one 2013 study indicated a strong correlation between how much top marginal tax rates were cut and greater pre-tax inequality across many countries.

For example, the Tax Policy Center evaluated a detailed supply-side tax cut proposal from presidential candidate Jeb Bush in 2015. Their conclusion was that the proposal would both increase deficits dramatically and worsen after-tax income inequality.

Criticism 

Critics of supply-side policies emphasize the growing federal deficits, increased income inequality and lack of growth. They argue that the Laffer curve only measures the rate of taxation, not tax incidence, which may be a stronger predictor of whether a tax code change is stimulative or dampening.

Writing in 2010, John Quiggin said, "To the extent that there was an economic response to the Reagan tax cuts, and to those of George W. Bush twenty years later, it seems largely to have been a Keynesian demand-side response, to be expected when governments provide households with additional net income in the context of a depressed economy."

Cutting marginal tax rates can also be perceived as primarily beneficial to the wealthy, which some see as politically rather than economically motivated:

Studies, which have analysed the tax cuts in 2001 (EGTRRA), provided controversial conclusions: the decrease in taxes have provided a generally positive impact on the future output from the effect of the lower tax rates on human capital accumulation, private saving and investment, labor supply; however, the tax cuts have produced adverse effects such as higher deficits and reduced national savings. Thus, Gale and Potter (2002) concluded that these tax cuts could not affect the GDP levels in any significant way in the next 10 years.

See also

Notes and references

Further reading 
 
 
  (working paper)

 
1976 neologisms
Economic growth
Schools of economic thought
Tax